Tölöykön is a village in southern Kyrgyzstan, a southern suburb of the city Osh. It is partly in the Kara-Suu District (population 2,295 in 2021), and partly in the city of Osh (population 3,378 in 2021).

References

Populated places in Osh Region